T.O.T.S. (also known as Tiny Ones Transport Service) is an American computer-animated children's television series created by Travis Braun, The series debuted on Disney Junior on June 14, 2019. It focuses on Pip and his friend Freddy who tend baby animals during their lives at a transporting service nursery.

Plot 
Pip and Freddy are two delivery birds in-training at T.O.T.S. (the Tiny Ones Transport Service). T.O.T.S. is a place where baby animals are nursed before being delivered to their families.

When a baby is ready for delivery, they are placed in a crate having colored edges indicating the gender of the baby: blue (male) or pink (female). When the baby reaches their family, Pip and Freddy, as with all delivery birds, would photograph the family with their computer tablet, called a FlyPad, for confirmation.

Besides delivering babies, Pip and Freddy also learn to solve problems under the guidance of K.C and Captain Candace Beakman, along with the other delivery storks.

Episodes

Characters

Main 
 Pip (voiced by Jet Jurgensmeyer in Seasons 1-2 and Tucker Chandler in Season 3) is a young Adélie penguin who serves as Freddy's navigator and is the main protagonist of the series, along with Freddy. First mentioned in episode "Back to Cool", his birthplace is Iceberg Alley, home of Penn and his parents, and other penguins. His catchphrase is "This penguin's got a plan!" Jet Jurgensmeyer stopped voicing Pip after Season 2 due to arriving at late teens, so Tucker Chandler took his place for Season 3.
 Freddy (voiced by Christian J. Simon) an ordinary flamingo who is Pip's partner, and the one who does the flying. Freddy's also the main protagonist, along with Pip. Freddy has long wings that help him fly. His catchphrase is "Flamin-go!"
 Captain Candace Beakman (voiced by Vanessa Williams) is a pelican who is the leader of T.O.T.S. She is also the mother of Mia the kitten. Beakman has a younger sister named Cora.
 K.C (voiced by Megan Hilty) is a teenage koala who works at T.O.T.S. who tends to the babies  in the nursery before they get delivered. K.C is also a guitarist. K.C has a brother, two sisters, a grandmother, and a surrogate uncle who is a cow. K.C affectionately refers to the babies at T.O.T.S. as "Lil' Nuggets".

Recurring
 Bodhi (voiced by Parvesh Cheena) is an insecure stork deliverer with the biggest wings at T.O.T.S. Bodhi tends to get spooked by mostly ordinary things, but is willing to help when assistance is needed.
 Ava (voiced by Melanie Minichino) is a street-talking female stork deliverer at T.O.T.S.
 J.P. (voiced by Henri Lubatti) is a prideful stork deliverer at T.O.T.S. who speaks with a French accent. J.P is one of the finest deliverers at T.O.T.S. J.P. won "Delivery Bird of the Month" ten consecutive times, thus Pip and Freddy see him as a role model. J.P. was also the company's fastest deliverer until J.P. was succeeded by Ava who in turn was succeeded by Bodhi. In the premiere episode of Season 2, Puppy Problems, J.P. becomes a father to a dachshund puppy named Lucky who is very mischievous, but J.P. fails to notice this. In the series finale episode of Season 3, Baby Fliers, he delivered Pip and Freddy when they were babies.
 Paulie (voiced by Dee Bradley Baker) is a parrot who is the air traffic controller at T.O.T.S. and often speaks his sentences twice.
 Mr. Woodbird (voiced by Eric Bauza) is a red-headed woodpecker who is the janitor at T.O.T.S. He sometimes gives Pip and Freddy inventions that are solutions to their problems.
 Mia (voiced by Charlie Townsend) a kitten who is the adopted daughter of Captain Beakman. Her catchphrase is "Mia help! Mia help!" when someone wants help with something, but even she needs help. In the episode "Lend Me Your Paw", Mia looks up to Pip and Freddy as her big brothers. Mia is the first baby whose name didn't start with the same letter as her animal species.
 Peggy (voiced by Angelica Hale) is a polar bear who wanted a better baby brother than her brother Paul until Peggy heard he got stuck in a small cave in the episode "Bringing Back Baby". She reappeared in the episode "Snow Place Like Home".
 Lucky (voiced by Alessandra Perez) is a dachshund puppy that loves to act mischievous and is the adopted son of J.P. In "All Aboard Babies," Lucky's shown to love dancing and showing off his moves to other babies.
 Red, Jed, and Zed (voiced by Hadley Gannaway, Remy Edgerly, and Julian Edwards respectively) are the stork triplets who visit T.O.T.S. in the episode "Training Daze" and want to become junior fliers. They appear again having a hard time teaming up to deliver a baby moose in "Junior Junior Fliers".
 Cora (voiced by Yvette Nicole Brown) is a pelican who is Captain Beakman's sister and Mia's adoptive aunt, introduced in "The Ring Bear".
 Sam (voiced by Kevin Michael Richardson) is Cora's husband, whom she marries in "The Ring Bear".
 Ms. Trunklebee (voiced by Kari Wahlgren) is an Asian elephant who's a teacher at the Sky School. She has a tendency to easily forget things, such as her reading glasses.
 Wyatt (voiced by Remy Edgerly) is a blue whale calf who is introduced in "Whale, Hello There".
 Precious (voiced by Amari McCoy) is a panda cub who is introduced in "Panda Excess".
 Scooter (voiced by Boone Nelson) is a baby skunk who is introduced in "A Stinky Situation".
 Cam (voiced by Hudson Cordero) is a baby purple-colored chameleon who is introduced in "The Colorful Chameleon".

Production 
The series was greenlit by Disney in April 2018. In February 2019, T.O.T.S. was renewed for a second season ahead of its broadcast premiere; which premiered on August 7, 2020. The show debuted on Disney Junior and Disney Channel in the United States on June 14, 2019, and on Disney Junior in Canada on June 22. On August 5, 2020, the series was renewed for a third ahead of the second-season premiere. It is produced by Titmouse, Inc. facilities in New York City with animation and additional production handled by the independent Icon Creative Studio in Vancouver and DQ Entertainment in Hyderabad for some episodes.

Home media
Home media is distributed by Walt Disney Studios Home Entertainment.

References

External links
 

2010s American animated television series
2020s American animated television series
2019 American television series debuts
2022 American television series endings
American children's animated action television series
American children's animated adventure television series
American children's animated comedy television series
American children's animated fantasy television series
American children's animated musical television series
American computer-animated television series
American preschool education television series
Animated preschool education television series
2010s preschool education television series
2020s preschool education television series
Disney Junior original programming
Disney animated television series
English-language television shows
Television series by Disney
Animated television series about birds
Animated television series about children
Animated television series about penguins
Animated duos